Buttiauxella warmboldiae  is a bacterium from the genus of Buttiauxella which has been isolated from a snail in Sydney in Australia. Buttiauxella warmboldiae is named after Sabine Warmbold.

References

Further reading 
 

Enterobacteriaceae
Bacteria described in 1996